Dwayne Killings (born April 4, 1981) is an American basketball player and current head coach for the Albany Great Danes men's basketball team.

Playing career
Killings was a walk-on player at UMass from 1999 to 2001, before transferring to Hampton University for his final two years of college.

Coaching career
Killings began coaching right after graduating from college, joining the staff of the NBA's Charlotte Bobcats as a special assistant and video coordinator. In 2006, he became the assistant director of basketball operators at Temple. Following three years with the Owls, Killings started working in the NBA D-League monitoring player development and progress. He began his first job as an assistant coach for college basketball in 2010 at Boston University, where he helped lead the team to a conference championship and an NCAA tournament appearance. In 2011, Killings returned to Temple, this time as an assistant coach helping to lead the team to two regular season conference titles and three NCAA tournament bids. In 2016, Killings was named an assistant coach at Connecticut. However, after two years on the staff, Killings was let go by Connecticut after the firing of head coach Kevin Ollie in March 2018. A few weeks later, on April 12, it was announced that Killings was hired as an assistant at Marquette.

On March 17, 2021, Killings was named the 16th head coach in Albany basketball history, replacing Will Brown. He finished 13–18 in his first season, earning sixth place in the America East Conference.

Legal issues 
On March 28, 2022, it was revealed that Killings had been put on leave for the last few weeks as Albany investigated an incident where Killings allegedly made incidental contact with a player of his before a game. On April 2, Killings was suspended five games and claimed the incident occurred in a pregame hype circle in November. In November 2022, Killings was sued by former player Luke Fizulich, who alleged that Killings "violently and viciously grabbed him, threw him up against a locker and struck him in the face, drawing blood." In January 2023, Killings was charged with fourth-degree misdemeanor assault against Fizulich in the state of Kentucky; he pled not guilty.

Head coaching record

References

External links
UConn bio 

1981 births
Living people
Albany Great Danes men's basketball coaches
American men's basketball coaches
American men's basketball players
Basketball coaches from Massachusetts
Basketball players from Massachusetts
Boston University Terriers men's basketball coaches
College men's basketball head coaches in the United States
Hampton Pirates men's basketball players
Marquette Golden Eagles men's basketball coaches
Temple Owls men's basketball coaches
UConn Huskies men's basketball coaches
UMass Minutemen basketball players